Cercocarpus fothergilloides is a Mexican plant species in the rose family. It is widely distributed in northern and eastern Mexico, from Tamaulipas and Coahuila south as far as Oaxaca.

Description
Cercocarpus fothergilloides is a shrub or small tree sometimes reaching 5 meters (17 feet) in height but usually much shorter. Leaves are egg-shaped, thick and leathery, with a thick coat of hairs on the underside but nearly hairless on the upper side. Flowers are borne in groups of 5–10.

Range and habitat
Cercocarpus fothergilloides is widely distributed in the states of Chihuahua, Coahuila, Nuevo León, Tamaulipas, San Luis Potosí, Querétaro, and Hidalgo, where it is found in the Sierra Madre Oriental and ranges on the Mexican Plateau. Its estimated extent of occurrence (EOO) is large, at 220,293.371 km2. Its estimated area of occupancy (AOO) is 304 km2, but is likely much larger.

It is found in montane dry shrubland (matorral or chaparral) and montane oak forest and woodland, from 1400 to 2,600 meters elevation.

Conservation
The species is subject to habitat loss from logging, livestock grazing, human-caused fires, and other human activity across much of its range. It is also found in areas of well-conserved habitat. It not currently considered threatened, and its conservation status is assessed as least concern.

References

fothergilloides
Plants described in 1913
Endemic flora of Mexico
Flora of the Sierra Madre Oriental
Flora of the Mexican Plateau
Flora of Northeastern Mexico